Giorgi Baindurashvili is a Georgian judoka.

Achievements

External links
 

Year of birth missing (living people)
Living people
Male judoka from Georgia (country)
Place of birth missing (living people)
21st-century people from Georgia (country)